Martel Inlet is an inlet forming the northeast head of Admiralty Bay, King George Island, in the South Shetland Islands off Antarctica. The inlet and most of its constituent features were charted in December 1909 by the Fourth French Antarctic Expedition under Jean-Baptiste Charcot and named "Fiord Martel" after J.L. Martel, a French politician. The mountain ridge Ullmann Spur is located at the head of the inlet.

Visca Anchorage is the northwestern cove of Martel Inlet. It was named by Charcot for an acquaintance in Montevideo. It was charted in 1927 by Discovery Investigations personnel on the Discovery and named after the leopard seal, Hydrurga leptonyx.

See also
 List of lighthouses in Antarctica

References

Inlets of Antarctica
Bodies of water of King George Island (South Shetland Islands)
Bodies of water of the South Shetland Islands
Lighthouses in Antarctica